China competed in the 1998 Asian Games which were held in Bangkok, Thailand from December 6, 1998, to December 20, 1998.

See also
 China at the Asian Games
 China at the Olympics
 Sport in China

Nations at the 1998 Asian Games
1998
Asian Games